Victor Arthur Eduard Janson (25 September 1884 – 29 June 1960) was a German stage and film actor and film director of Latvian ethnicity.

Selected filmography

Actor
 Your Dearest Enemy (1916)
 When Four Do the Same (1917)
 Carmen (1918)
 The Ballet Girl (1918)
 The Seeds of Life (1918)
 Ferdinand Lassalle (1918)
 The Yellow Ticket  (1918)
 My Wife, the Movie Star (1919)
 The Dagger of Malaya (1919)
 One or the Other (1919)
 Superstition (1919)
 The Teahouse of the Ten Lotus Flowers (1919)
 Countess Doddy (1919)
 The Howling Wolf (1919)
 The Merry Husband (1919)
 The Panther Bride (1919)
 The Oyster Princess (1919)
 The Woman at the Crossroads (1919)
 The Housing Shortage (1920)
 The Last Kolczaks (1920)
 The Secret of the Mummy (1921)
 Love at the Wheel (1921)
 The Wild Cat (1921)
 The Girl with the Mask (1922)
 Das Milliardensouper (1923)
 Niniche (1925)
 Circus Romanelli (1926)
 The Ones Down There (1926)
 The Divorcée (1926)
 At the Edge of the World (1927)
 Holzapfel Knows Everything (1932)
 So You Don't Know Korff Yet? (1938)
 The Leghorn Hat (1939)
 Men Are That Way (1939)
 The Unfaithful Eckehart (1940)
 The Way to Freedom (1941)
 We Make Music (1942)
 The Great Love (1942)
 Rembrandt (1942)
 Back Then (1943)
 Come Back to Me (1944)
 Viennese Girls (1945)
 A Man Like Maximilian (1945)
 Peter Voss, Thief of Millions (1946)
 Ghost in the Castle (1947)
 The Court Concert (1948)
 Journey to Happiness (1948)
 The Marriage of Figaro (1949)
 Professor Nachtfalter (1951)
 Torreani (1951)
 The Prince of Pappenheim (1952)
 When the Heath Dreams at Night (1952)
 Hit Parade (1953)
 The Rose of Stamboul (1953)
 Such a Charade (1953)

Director
 The Yellow Ticket  (1918)
 The Man of Action (1919)
 The Lady in Black (1920)
 The Secret of the Mummy (1921)
 Love at the Wheel (1921)
 The Girl with the Mask (1922)
 Das Milliardensouper (1923)
 Niniche (1925)
 The Dealer from Amsterdam (1925)
 The Queen of the Baths (1926)
 The Ones Down There (1926)
 Sword and Shield (co-director: Rudolf Dworsky, 1926)
 The Divorcée (co-director: Rudolf Dworsky, 1926)
 A Girl with Temperament (1928)
 Vienna, City of My Dreams (1928)
 The Circus Princess (1929)
 Black Forest Girl (1929)
 The Black Domino (1929)
 Hungarian Nights (1929)
 Danube Waltz (1930)
 The Woman They Talk About (1931)
 The Beggar Student (1931)
 Once There Was a Waltz (1932)
 The Blue of Heaven (1932)
 Distorting at the Resort (1932)
 The Page from the Dalmasse Hotel (1933)
 The Tsarevich (1933)
 A Woman Who Knows What She Wants (1934)
 The Voice of Love (1934)
 The Blonde Carmen (1935)
 She and the Three (1935)
 Girls in White (1936)
 The Coral Princess (1937)
 Who's Kissing Madeleine? (1939)

References

External links
 

1884 births
1960 deaths
German film directors
German male film actors
German male silent film actors
Emigrants from the Russian Empire to Germany
Latvian male silent film actors
Film people from Riga
20th-century German male actors
20th-century Latvian male actors
Actors from Riga